Khoziain (хозяин) sometimes khozain is a Russian word meaning "owner", describing a certain type of political leader.

The term's applicability to the politicians originates from the Russian word khoziain (of a household), usually the oldest male entrusted with the welfare of the family. For someone to merit the title of a real khoziain he must take care of those in his domain.

It is a rich term which traditionally refers to a leader of a given social domain, a home, a village, an enterprise, or a country, although it can be also  used to define a leader of a criminal gang.

It is sometimes difficult to classify the khozian-politician in a classical political sense since their overriding concerns are not a leftist or rightist political agenda, but the welfare of the group where ideology is less important than pragmatism, strength of character and problem solving skills.

A person who displays talents in this direction is called a khoziaistvennik.

A khoziain politician can easily be seen as authoritarian in a Western political context. A more accurate description would be to classify him as a father figure.

Examples of khoziain politicians
 Joseph Stalin
 Vladimir Putin
 Alexander Lukashenko, President of Belarus
 Yuri Luzhkov, Mayor of Moscow
 Oleksandr Omelchenko, former Mayor of Kyiv
 Igor Smirnov, President of Transnistria

References

 The Discourse of Civilization in the Works of Russia's New
Eurasianists: Lev Gumilev and Alexander Panarin
 http://www.yorku.ca/yciss/activities/documents/PCSPPaper002.pdf

Politics of Russia
Russian words and phrases